Mount Kane is a mountain standing  west-southwest of Squires Peak in the Playfair Mountains of southern Palmer Land, Antarctica. It was mapped by the United States Geological Survey from surveys and U.S. Navy air photos, 1961–67, and was named by the Advisory Committee on Antarctic Names for Alan F. Kane, a construction mechanic with the South Pole Station winter party in 1964.

References

External links

Mountains of Palmer Land